CBS Television Workshop is an American anthology series that aired on CBS from January to April 1952. The series is noted for featuring early television appearances of several well known actors, including Audrey Hepburn, James Dean, Sidney Poitier and Grace Kelly.

The first episode, which premiered on January 13, 1952, is a dramatized 30-minute version of Don Quixote starring Boris Karloff and directed by Sidney Lumet. Grace Kelly made an appearance as Dulcinea.

Guest stars
 James Dean
 Albert Dekker
 Geraldine Fitzgerald
 Audrey Hepburn
 Conrad Janis
 Boris Karloff
 Grace Kelly
 James Lipton
 Leslie Nielsen
 Sidney Poitier

External links

CBS Television Workshop at CVTA

1952 American television series debuts
1952 American television series endings
1950s American anthology television series
Television series by CBS Studios
1950s American drama television series
Black-and-white American television shows
CBS original programming
English-language television shows